Iván Sandoval may refer to:

 Iván Sandoval (Argentine footballer), forward for Cañuelas Fútbol Club
 Iván Sandoval (Chilean footballer), midfielder for C.D. Cobresal